Lõve River is a river in Saare County, Estonia. The river is 32 km long, and its basin size is 160.2 km2. It runs into Oessaare Bay.

References

Rivers of Estonia
Saare County